California's 40th State Senate district is one of 40 California State Senate districts. It is currently represented by Democrat Ben Hueso of San Diego.

District profile 
The district runs along the entire border between California and Mexico. The heavily Latino district includes urban San Diego neighborhoods in the west and rural Imperial County farmland in the east.

All of Imperial County
 Brawley
 Calexico
 Calipatria
 El Centro
 Holtville
 Imperial
 Westmorland

San Diego County – 24.6%
 Bonita
 Chula Vista
 Imperial Beach
 Jamul
 La Presa
 National City
 San Diego – 27.1%

Election results from statewide races

List of senators 
Due to redistricting, the 40th district has been moved around different parts of the state. The current iteration resulted from the 2011 redistricting by the California Citizens Redistricting Commission.

Election results 1994 - present

2018

2014

2013 (special)

2010

2006

2002

1998

1994

See also 
 California State Senate
 California State Senate districts
 Districts in California

References

External links 
 District map from the California Citizens Redistricting Commission

40
Government of Imperial County, California
Government of San Diego County, California
Government of San Diego
East County (San Diego County)
Imperial Valley
Mountain Empire (San Diego County)
South Bay (San Diego County)
Brawley, California
Calexico, California
Chula Vista, California
El Centro, California
Imperial Beach, California
National City, California